Las Vegas City Schools is a school district based in Las Vegas, New Mexico, United States.

The district covers a  area in northern San Miguel County.

Within the city of Las Vegas, the district serves areas located east of the Gallinas River. The district extends to Mora County, where it includes Watrous.

Schools
High School
Robertson High School
Middle School
Memorial Middle School
Elementary Schools
Los Niños Elementary School
Mike "Mateo" Sena Elementary School
Sierra Vista Elementary School

Enrollment
2007-2008 School Year: 2,122 students
2006-2007 School Year: 2,102 students
2005-2006 School Year: 2,109 students
2004-2005 School Year: 2,153 students
2003-2004 School Year: 2,200 students
2002-2003 School Year: 2,277 students
2001-2002 School Year: 2,406 students
2000-2001 School Year: 2,497 students

Demographics
There were a total of 2,122 students enrolled in Las Vegas City Public Schools during the 2007–2008 school year. The gender makeup of the district was 49.91% female and 50.09% male. The racial makeup of the district was 86.43% Hispanic, 11.03% White, 1.23% Asian/Pacific Islander, 0.85% Native American, and 0.46% African American.

See also
List of school districts in New Mexico
West Las Vegas Schools - a district serving areas of Las Vegas located west of the Gallinas River.

References

External links
Las Vegas City Schools – Official site

Las Vegas, New Mexico
School districts in New Mexico
Education in San Miguel County, New Mexico
Mora County, New Mexico